Estoloides medioplagiata is a species of beetle in the family Cerambycidae. It was described by Vitali in 2007. It is known from Jamaica.

References

Estoloides
Beetles described in 2007